The House at Pluck's Gutter is a novel by Manning Coles, published in 1963, featuring the protagonist Thomas Elphinstone Hambledon.

The book was named after the old Ferry Cottage at Plucks Gutter.

Notes

1963 British novels
Novels set in Kent
Hodder & Stoughton books
British spy novels